The 1918 All-Big Ten Conference football team consists of American football players selected to the All-Big Ten Conference teams chosen by various selectors for the 1918 Big Ten Conference football season.

All Big-Ten selections

Ends
 Clarence A. MacDonald, Ohio State (HP, WE-1)
 Robert Reed, Iowa (HP, WE-1)
 Robert J. Dunne, Michigan (MF)
 George C. Bucheit, Illinois (MF, WE-2)
 Carl E. Zanger, Northwestern (WE-2)

Tackles
 Burt Ingwersen, Illinois (HP, MF, WE-1)
 Angus Goetz, Michigan (HP, MF, WE-1)
 Berthold Mann, Wisconsin (WE-2)
 Eugene D. McLaughlin, Northwestern (MF [guard], WE-2)

Guards
 Albert W. T. Mohr, Jr., Illinois (HP, WE-1)
 Harry Hunzelman, Iowa (WE-1)
 Miller, Chicago (HP)
 Wallace, Minnesota (MF)
 Fred R. Hanschmann, Illinois (WE-2)
 F. W. Jordan, Minnesota (WE-2)

Centers
 Ernie Vick, Michigan (HP, WE-1)
 Jack Depler, Illinois (MF)
 Reber, Chicago (WE-2)

Quarterbacks
 Marshall Underhill, Northwestern (HP, WE-1)
 Robert H. Fletcher, Illinois (MF)
 William S. Kelly, Iowa (WE-2)

Halfbacks
 Jesse B. Kirkpatrick, Illinois (HP, WE-1)
 Frank Steketee, Michigan (HP, WE-1)
 Thomas C. Davies, Ohio State (MF)
 Ralph E. Fletcher, Illinois (MF)
 Gus Eckberg, Minnesota (WE-2)
 Elton, Chicago (WE-2)

Fullbacks
 Norman Kingsley, Minnesota (HP, WE-1)
 William K. Kopp, Illinois (MF)
 Fred Lohman, Iowa (WE-2)

Key

HP = Howard Pearson, sporting editor of the Detroit Journal

MF = Matt Foley in Chicago Herald and Examiner

WE = Walter Eckersall in Chicago Tribune

See also
1918 College Football All-America Team

References

1918 Big Ten Conference football season
All-Big Ten Conference football teams